Sudnobudivna (proposed, Havan') is a station currently under construction on the Kyiv Metro's Podilsko-Vyhurivska Line. The station is part of the first segment of the Podilsko-Vyhurivska Line, which is scheduled to be completed after 2022.

History
The station is located on the Rybalskyi Peninsula in the Podil district of Kyiv. The station is named after the Kuznya na Rybalskomu ship building company which is located in the vicinity. It is being built concurrently with the Podilskyi Metro Bridge, under which it is located. It will be located in between the Podilska and Trukhaniv Ostriv stations, the latter of which will be built according to the same architectural principles as the Sudnobudivna station.

The station will be enclosed with transparent glass on the outside, to protect passengers from the weathers elements. On either end of the station, there will be exits that connect to the station vestibules, with a parking lot for the station's workers included nearby.

References

Proposed Kyiv Metro stations
Rybalskyi Island